The 1956 All-Big Ten Conference football team consists of American football players chosen by various organizations to the All-Big Ten Conference teams for the 1956 Big Ten Conference football season.

All-Big Ten selections

Quarterbacks
 Ken Ploen, Iowa (AP-1; UP-1)
 Len Dawson, Purdue (AP-2)
 Bob Cox, Minnesota (UP-2)

Halfbacks
 Abe Woodson, Illinois (AP-1; UP-1)
 Terry Barr, Michigan (UP-1)
 Bob McKelver, Northwestern (AP-1; UP-2)
 Don Clark, Ohio State (AP-2)
 Clarence Peaks, Michigan State (UP-2)

Fullbacks
 Mel Dillard, Purdue (AP-1; UP-1)
 John Herrnstein, Michigan (AP-2; UP-2)
 Clarence Peaks, Michigan State (AP-2)

Ends
 Ron Kramer, Michigan (AP-1; UP-1)
 Frank Gilliam, Iowa (AP-1; UP-1)
 Lamar Lundy, Purdue (AP-2; UP-2)
 Tom Maentz, Michigan (AP-2; UP-3)
 Brad Bomba, Indiana (UP-2)

Tackles
 Bob Hobert, Minnesota (AP-1; UP-1)
 Alex Karras, Iowa (AP-1; UP-1)
 Joel Jones, Michigan State (AP-2; UP-2)
 Frank Youso, Minnesota (AP-2)
 Dick Guy, Ohio State (UP-2)

Guards
 Jim Parker, Ohio State (AP-1; UP-1)
 Dick Hill, Michigan (AP-1; UP-3)
 Al Viola, Northwestern (AP-2; UP-1)
 Dan Currie, Michigan State (AP-2; UP-2)
 Percy Oliver, Illinois (UP-2)

Centers
 John Matsko, Michigan State (AP-1; UP-2)
 Don Suchy, Iowa (AP-2; UP-1)

Key

See also
1956 College Football All-America Team

References

All-Big Ten Conference
All-Big Ten Conference football teams